The Southern Association was a higher-level minor league in American organized baseball from 1901 through 1961. For most of its existence, the Southern Association was two steps below the Major Leagues; it was graded Class A (1902–1935), Class A1 (1936–1945) and Class AA (1946–1961). Although the SA was known as the Southern League through 1919, the later Double-A Southern League was not descended from the Southern Association; the modern SL came into existence in 1964 as the successor to the original South Atlantic ("Sally") League.

A stable, eight-team loop, the Southern Association's member teams typically included the Atlanta Crackers, Birmingham Barons, Chattanooga Lookouts, Little Rock Travelers, Memphis Chicks, Nashville Vols and New Orleans Pelicans.  The eighth club was usually either the Knoxville Smokies, Mobile Bears or Shreveport Sports.

The Association was formed from the remnants of the 1885–1899 Southern League by Abner Powell, Newt Fisher, and Charley Frank.

Resisted integration
After Jackie Robinson broke the color barrier in 1946 with the Montreal Royals of the International League, the Southern Association continued to adhere to the Jim Crow segregation laws of the time.  Only one African-American ever played a meaningful game during this time: Nat Peeples of the 1954 Atlanta Crackers, the only black player in the league's history. On April 9–10, 1954, Peeples played in two road games in Mobile, and went hitless in four at bats. He was demoted to the already-integrated, Single-A Jacksonville Braves of the Sally League before the Crackers played a home game.

The Southern Association then played the rest of its history, through the end of 1961, as a racially segregated league. Partly due to this, its Major-League parent clubs were among the last to integrate during the 1950s, a period when African-Americans and Latin-American players of African descent were beginning to dominate Major League Baseball. By the end of the 1950s, the SA was the target of a boycott by activists of the Civil Rights Movement.

Disbanded in 1961
In its last three years, the Southern Association was plagued by frequent franchise shifts.  Little Rock moved to Shreveport after the 1958 season, and New Orleans moved to Little Rock after the 1959 season.  Memphis' park burned down just before the 1960 season, forcing the Chicks to play in several temporary facilities before moving to Macon, Georgia for 1961.  The league finally ceased operation after the 1961 season.

Member cities slowly began to join remaining leagues, which were racially integrated. The Atlanta club moved up to the Triple-A International League in 1962. Little Rock followed suit (as the renamed Arkansas Travelers), moving to the International circuit in 1963 and the Pacific Coast League in 1964–1965, before making a permanent home in the Double-A Texas League in 1966. Macon, a longtime member of the Sally League, returned to that circuit in 1962. After a one-year hiatus, Nashville and Chattanooga joined the Sally League in 1963. Later in the decade, Birmingham (1964) and Mobile (1966) joined the Southern League, and Memphis and Shreveport (both in 1968) would enter the Texas circuit.

Member teams
 Atlanta Crackers 1902–1961 - at times known as the Firemen, amongst various other names depending on which newspaper was reporting on them
 Birmingham Barons 1901–1961 — at times known as the Iron Barons
 Chattanooga Lookouts 1901–1902; 1910–1943; 1944–1961
 Knoxville Smokies 1931–1944
 Little Rock Travelers 1901–1909; 1915–1958; 1960–1961
 Macon Peaches 1961
 Memphis Chicks 1901–1960 — at times known as the Chickasaws or Egyptians
 Mobile Bears 1908–1931; 1944–1961 — known as Marines (1931)
Montgomery Rebels 1903–1914; 1943; 1956 — at times known as the Black Sox, Senators, Climbers and Billikens
 Nashville Vols 1901–1961
 New Orleans Pelicans 1901–1959
 Selma Christians 1901
 Shreveport Sports 1901–1907; 1959–1961 — at times known as the Giants and Pirates

Champions

While a league pennant winner was crowned each season, some seasons (1928 and 1932–61) also concluded with either the top two or four teams in the league competing in playoffs to determine a league champion. These playoffs varied between being best-of-five and best-of-seven contests. The Atlanta Crackers, termed by some the "New York Yankees of the minors," won the Southern Association pennant 13 times, the most among all teams. They are followed by the New Orleans Pelicans, with nine pennants. As far as playoff championships are concerned, the Nashville Vols captured the most, with nine—dominating the league with six straight championships from 1939 to 1944. They are followed by Atlanta, with six playoff titles. Combining both pennants and playoffs, the Crackers won the most (21), with the Vols trailing them with 17. On the other hand, the Chattanooga Lookouts, charter members of the association, won only one title during their 54 years in the league—with that coming during the Southern Association's final, 1961 campaign.

Most Valuable Player Award

The Southern Association gave a most valuable player award to the most outstanding player in the league from 1937 to 1957. In 1937, Coaker Triplett won the first ever Southern Association Most Valuable Player Award. Stan Palys won the final award in 1957.

References
General

Specific

 
Southern Association
Baseball leagues in Alabama
Baseball leagues in Arkansas
Baseball leagues in Georgia (U.S. state)
Baseball leagues in Louisiana
Baseball leagues in Tennessee
Sports leagues established in 1901
Sports leagues disestablished in 1961
1901 establishments in the United States
1961 disestablishments in the United States